Julius Bab (December 11, 1880 – February 12, 1955) was a German dramatist and theater critic.

He was a cofounder of the Kulturbund Deutscher Juden. Bab was a close friend of journalist and theater critic Siegfried Jacobsohn and a key contributor to the early years of the magazine Schaubühne, the later Weltbühne. He was a mentor to the young actor and future film director Veit Harlan.

In 1939 he emigrated to the United States through France. In 1951 he visited Germany in a lecture tour.

He died in Roslyn Heights, New York in 1955.

Works
Around 90 books and biographies about the theater including:

Der Mensch auf der Bühne

References

Bibliography
 Elisabeth Albanis: German-Jewish Cultural Identity from 1900 to the Aftermath of the First World War: A Comparative Study of Moritz Goldstein, Julius Bab and Ernest Lissauer. Niemeyer, Tübingen 2002.  ISBN 9783484651371 
Noack, Frank. Veit Harlan: The Life and Work of a Nazi Filmmaker. University Press of Kentucky, 2016.
Sylvia Rogge-Gau: Julius Bab und der Jüdische Kulturbund. Metropol, Berlin 1999

External links
 
 Erdal Can Alkoçlar
 

1880 births
1955 deaths
People from Roslyn Heights, New York
Place of birth missing
19th-century German Jews
German emigrants to the United States
German male dramatists and playwrights
20th-century German dramatists and playwrights
20th-century German male writers